Aleksandr Vasilyevich Polukarov (born November 27, 1959) is a Russian professional football coach and a former player. As of 2009, he worked as a director and assistant coach for FC Moscow.

Honours
 Soviet Top League bronze: 1988, 1991.
 Soviet Cup winner: 1986.
 Soviet Cup finalist: 1982, 1988, 1989, 1991.

European club competitions
 European Cup Winners' Cup 1986–87 with FC Torpedo Moscow: 5 games.
 UEFA Cup 1988–89 with FC Torpedo Moscow: 2 games.
 European Cup Winners' Cup 1989–90 with FC Torpedo Moscow: 4 games.
 UEFA Cup 1990–91 with FC Torpedo Moscow: 7 games.
 UEFA Champions League 1992–93 qualification with Maccabi Tel Aviv: 2 games.

External links

1959 births
Living people
Footballers from Luhansk
Soviet footballers
Russian footballers
Russian expatriate footballers
FC Zorya Luhansk players
FC Torpedo Moscow players
Maccabi Tel Aviv F.C. players
Maccabi Herzliya F.C. players
Hapoel Jerusalem F.C. players
Maccabi Ironi Ashdod F.C. players
Bnei Sakhnin F.C. players
FC Moscow players
Soviet Top League players
Liga Leumit players
Russian football managers
FC Moscow managers
Ukrainian emigrants to Russia
Expatriate footballers in Israel
Russian expatriate sportspeople in Israel
Association football defenders